Niko-Petteri Kuukasjärvi (born 9 September 1999) is a Finnish professional footballer who plays for  PS Kemi, as a defender.

References

1999 births
Living people
Finnish footballers
Kemi City F.C. players
TP-47 players
Veikkausliiga players
Kakkonen players
Association football defenders